Tahir Jalil Habbush al-Tikriti (born 1950) is a former Iraqi intelligence official who served under the regime of Saddam Hussein; in 2001, he was Iraq's head of intelligence and as such, informed MI6 in January 2003 (shortly before the start of the Iraq War) that Iraq had no WMD. He was the Jack of Diamonds in the most-wanted Iraqi playing cards and is still a fugitive with up to $1 million reward for information leading to his capture. It is believed that al-Tikriti at some point operated from Syria and most likely played a direct role in the day-to-day operations of the insurgency against U.S.-led Coalition forces under the command of Izzat Ibrahim al-Douri.

Forged 2003 Habbush letter

According to the London Sunday Telegraph, Mohamed Atta is mentioned in a letter allegedly discovered in Iraq handwritten by Tahir Jalil Habbush al-Takriti, former chief of the Iraqi Intelligence Service. Habbush's July 1, 2001, memo is labeled "Intelligence Items", stating: 

The memo is believed to be a forgery. According to Newsweek, "U.S. officials and a leading Iraqi document expert [say] the document is most likely a forgery, part of a thriving new trade in dubious Iraqi documents that has cropped up in the wake of the collapse of Saddam's regime." In The Way of the World, author Ron Suskind alleges that the Bush administration itself ordered the forgery. Habbush then supposedly signed the letter, having already been resettled in Jordan with $5 million from the US.

See also
List of fugitives from justice who disappeared
Mohamed Atta's alleged Prague connection
U.S. list of most-wanted Iraqis

References

1950 births
Fugitives
Fugitives wanted by the United States
Iraqi generals
Living people
People of the Iraq War
Most-wanted Iraqi playing cards